Kis Desh Mein Hai Meraa Dil (In Which Country Does My Heart Live) is an Indian drama television series that aired on Star Plus. It starred Additi Gupta, Harshad Chopda, Sushant Singh Rajput and Meher Vij. It was produced by Ekta Kapoor and Shobha Kapoor under Balaji Telefilms.

Plot

The story is of two lovers, Prem and Heer and their undying love for one another. Despite conspiracies, tragedies and heart-break, their undying true love for one another prevails through the roughest of times. In parallel, the show also focuses on Prem and Heer's siblings Preet and Meher.

Cast

Main
 Additi Gupta as Heer Maan Juneja: Teji and Balraj's elder daughter; Meher and Nihaal's sister; Prem's wife; Chahat's mother (2008–2010)
Harshad Chopda as Prem Juneja: Lalit and Rasika's son; Gayatri's step-son; Preet, Harman and Veera's half-brother; Heer's husband; Chahat's father (2008–2010)
 Sushant Singh Rajput as Preet Juneja: Lalit and Gayatri's elder son; Prem's half-brother; Harman and Veera's brother; Varun's cousin; Meher's husband (2008–2009)
 Meher Vij as Meher Maan Juneja: Balraj and Teji's daughter; Heer and Nihaal's sister; Preet's wife; Harman's ex-fiancé

Recurring
 Varun Kapoor as Varun Gangotre: Shubhi's son; Prem, Preet, Harman and Veera's cousin
 Virendra Saxena as Balraj Maan: Balwant's brother; Lalit's best friend; Teji's husband; Heer, Meher and Nihaal's father
 Sadhana Singh as Tejassi "Teji" Maan: Balraj's wife; Heer, Meher and Nihaal's mother
 Mahesh Shetty as Nihaal Maan: Balraj and Teji's son; Heer and Meher's brother; Veera's husband
 Krystle D'Souza as Veera Juneja Maan: Lalit and Gayatri's daughter; Preet and Harman's sister; Prem's half-sister; Nihaal's wife
 Deepak Qazir as Lalit Juneja: Balraj's best friend; Shubhi's brother; Rasika's widower; Gayatri's husband; Prem, Preet, Harman and Veera's father
 Shama Deshpande as Gayatri Juneja: Lalit's second wife; Prem's step-mother; Preet, Harman and Veera's mother
 Manoj Chandila / Tabrez Khan as Harman Juneja: Lalit and Gayatri's younger son; Preet and Veera's brother; Prem's half-brother; Maya's husband; Meher's ex-fiancé
 Madhura Naik as Maya Juneja: Harman's wife
 Nidhi Tikoo as Kulraj Gupta
 Manav Vij as Kiran Gupta
 Ranjeev Verma as Balwant Maan: Balraj's brother; Daljeet's husband; Ashlesha's father
 Tasneem Sheikh as Daljeet Maan: Balwant's wife; Ashlesha's mother
 Mihika Verma as Ashlesha Maan: Balwant and Daljeet's daughter; Preet and Prem's ex-fiancé
 Muskaan Uppal as Chahat Juneja: Prem and Heer's daughter
 Jai Kalra as Rishabh Rampaal
 Apara Mehta as Bharti Rampaal
 Vishal Thakkar / Dev Keswani as Dheer
 Dimple Jhangiani as Sanjana Rampaal
 Avinash Sachdev as Prashant Chhabria / Manmeet
 Harsh Somaiya as Ketan Gupta
 Simran Khanna as Geet
Rachana Parulkar as Rano
Sudha Chandran as Inspector Sagarika Solanki
Anita Hassanandani as Shruti
Puja Banerjee as Vrinda
Hina Khan as Akshara
Parul Chauhan as Ragini
Anjali Abrol as Rani
Pooja Gor as Pratigya

Production
Initially titled as Khandaan, it was later renamed as Kis Desh Mein Hai Meraa Dil before premiere. Sushant Singh Rajput playing Preet Singh Juneja was killed in a sequence. However, on viewers demand, during the finale of the series, he returned as a spirit.

Speaking about the series, producer Ekta Kapoor said, "I would love to describe this as an ethereal story from the heart. This show is bound to ignite the magic of love and romance on television once again."

In March 2009, the series was given a warning from the channel for its non satisfactory ratings to improve.

In November 2008, the shootings and telecast of all the Hindi television series including this series and films were stalled on 8 November 2008 due to dispute by the technician workers of FWICE (Federation of Western India Cine Employees) for increasing the wages, better work conditions and more breaks between shootings. FWICE first took a strike on 1 October 2008 when they addressed their problems with the producers and production was stalled. A contract was signed after four days discussions and shooting were happening only for two hours content in a day then after which differences increased between them while channels gave them time until 30 October 2008 to sort it out. Failing to do so lead to protests again from 10 November 2008 to 19 November 2008 during which channels blacked out new broadcasts and repeat telecasts were shown from 10 November 2008. On 19 November 2008, the strike was called off after settling the disputes and the production resumed. The new episodes started to telecast from 1 December 2008.

References

External links 
 Kis Desh Mein Hai Meraa Dil Streaming on Hotstar

Balaji Telefilms television series
Indian television soap operas
2008 Indian television series debuts
2010 Indian television series endings
StarPlus original programming
Television shows set in Punjab, India